Helicia rostrata is a species of plant in the family Proteaceae. It is endemic to Papua New Guinea.

References

Flora of Papua New Guinea
rostrata
Vulnerable plants
Taxonomy articles created by Polbot